Wu Jin-yun (3 March 1938 — 27 June 2022) was a Taiwanese athlete. She competed in the women's shot put and the women's discus throw at the 1960 Summer Olympics.

References

External links
 

1938 births
2022 deaths
Athletes (track and field) at the 1960 Summer Olympics
Taiwanese female shot putters
Taiwanese female discus throwers
Olympic athletes of Taiwan
Asian Games bronze medalists for Chinese Taipei
Asian Games medalists in athletics (track and field)
Athletes (track and field) at the 1958 Asian Games
Athletes (track and field) at the 1966 Asian Games
Medalists at the 1958 Asian Games
Medalists at the 1966 Asian Games
20th-century Taiwanese women